Dow Hall may refer to:

 Blind Department Building and Dow Hall, State School for the Blind, in Faribault, Minnesota, United States
 Dow Hall, at Briarcliff College, formerly Mrs. Dow's School for Girls, in Briarcliff Manor, New York, United States

See also
 Dow House (disambiguation)

Architectural disambiguation pages